Chen Tsu-li, also known as James T. L. Chen, (born 28 May 1933) is a Taiwanese former basketball player and coach.

National team playing career
Chen competed as a part of the Republic of China's senior national team at the 1956 Summer Olympics. He won silver medals at the 1958 Asian Games, and the 1960 FIBA Asian Championship. He also played at the 1959 FIBA World Championship, which he led in scoring average, at 20.1 points per game.

Coaching career
After he ended his basketball playing career, Chen became a basketball coach. He was a head coach in both club teams in Taiwan, and of the senior Taiwanese national team, which he coached at the 1987 FIBA Asian Championship, which was held in Bangkok.

References

External links
 

1932 births
Living people
Asian Games medalists in basketball
Asian Games silver medalists for Chinese Taipei
Basketball players at the 1956 Summer Olympics
Basketball players at the 1958 Asian Games
Medalists at the 1958 Asian Games
Olympic basketball players of Taiwan
Taiwanese basketball coaches
Taiwanese men's basketball players
People from Huzhou
Basketball players from Zhejiang
Taiwanese people from Zhejiang
1959 FIBA World Championship players
Republic of China men's national basketball team players
Chinese Taipei men's national basketball team coaches